Hypsotropa infumatella is a species of snout moth in the genus Hypsotropa. It was described by Ragonot in 1901, and is known from South Africa.

References

Endemic moths of South Africa
Moths described in 1901
Anerastiini